TV Asia was the first Asian TV channel to be founded in the UK. Launched in 1990, and originally broadcasting overnights during Sky One's downtime, it was Europe's first entertainment and information channel for the South Asian community from the Indian subcontinent. TV Asia was conceptualised and founded by Wasim Mehmood and Mohan Thariyan and after it had secured its status in the UK in 1992, it was sold to a partnership formed between the top Indian talent represented by Amitabh Bachchan; after two successful years the channel was sold at a profit to Dolphin Group owned by Ketan Somaiya. Dolphin Group negotiated the deal for the channel to be sold to Subash Chandra's flagship Zee (India) and TV Asia was renamed as Zee TV (UK).

Some of the most popular shows on TV Asia and ZEE TV.UK were first ever Asian pop chart show 'Music Channel Charts' and drama serial 'French Toast', both were produced and directed by popular British Asian artist Yasir Akhtar and Ghazanfar Ali.

In New York City and North America, TV Asia was also the first coast-to-coast entertainment and information channel for the South Asian community settled in the U.S. In spite of different ownership, currently TV Asia has retained the same logo and style of programming and airs regularly scheduled programs in Hindi, English, Gujarati, and other regional languages, 24 hours a day, seven days a week. The current Chairman/CEO of TV Asia is H.R. Shah.

See also
List of South Asian television channels in the United States

References

External links
Official Website (United States)

1990 establishments in the United Kingdom
1995 disestablishments in the United Kingdom
Television channels and stations established in 1990
Television channels and stations disestablished in 1995